Northway Games is a Canadian independent video game studio consisting of husband-and-wife team Colin and Sarah Northway. They are best known for the game Fantastic Contraption, a puzzle game nominated for the Independent Games Festival Nuovo Award for Innovation in Game Design in 2016, Incredipede, another puzzler, featured at the Tokyo Game Show's Sense of Wonder Night in 2011 and nominated for the IGF Excellence In Visual Art in 2013, and also the Rebuild strategy series. The two have received some press coverage over their digital nomad lifestyle.

Games 
 Incredipede (2012)
 Rebuild (2014)
 Rebuild 2
 Rebuild 3 (2015)
 Fantastic Contraption (2016)
 I Was a Teenage Exocolonist (2022)

References 

Indie video game developers
Canadian video game designers
Video game development companies